State Route 352 (SR 352) is a  southeast-to-northwest state highway in northwestern Marion County in the west-central part of the U.S. state of Georgia. Its entire length is located just to the east of Fort Benning.

Route description
SR 352 begins at an intersection with SR 41 north-northwest of Buena Vista, just to the east of Brantley. The highway travels to the northwest through generally rural parts of the county, until it meets its northern terminus, an intersection with SR 355 south-southwest of the community of Juniper.

History
SR 352 was built along its current alignment between 1960 and 1963. By 1966, the entire length of road was paved.

Major intersections

See also

References

External links

 Georgia Roads (Routes 341 - 360)

352
Transportation in Marion County, Georgia